"Feel It Still" is a song by American rock band Portugal. The Man. The song draws on the melody from the Marvelettes' 1961 hit "Please Mr. Postman"; written by the band along with producers John Hill and Asa Taccone, "Feel It Still" also includes a credit for Motown songwriter Brian Holland. It serves as the second single and first radio single off their eighth studio album, Woodstock. The song reached number one on the US Alternative Songs, Mexican and Russian Tophit airplay chart. It was also their first entry on the US Billboard Hot 100, becoming a sleeper hit, as it took eight months to peak at number four in November 2017.

The track reached the top 10 in 18 countries including Australia, Belgium, Canada, France, Germany, Ireland, New Zealand, Norway, Portugal, Slovenia, Spain, Switzerland, the United Kingdom and the United States.

In January 2018, the song won the Best Pop Duo/Group Performance at the 60th Annual Grammy Awards.

Music video
The music video was released on March 6, 2017. An interactive version was also released, powered by technology from WIREWAX. The interactive video contained "Easter eggs" that a viewer could click on to build their #resist toolkit to learn and support 30 different social and political causes.

Commercial performance
The song became the band's first to top both the Billboard Alternative Songs and the Adult Alternative Songs charts. Taking six weeks to do so, it is the fastest an artist has achieved their first chart-topper on the latter chart since Mumford & Sons' "I Will Wait" took three weeks to reach number one. "Feel It Still" also climbed to number four on the Billboard Hot 100, becoming their first entry on the chart. The song also peaked at number one on the Russian and Mexican airplay charts, and peaked inside the top 20 in France and Switzerland. "Feel It Still" has spent twenty weeks at number one on the Alternative Songs chart, becoming the longest-running number-one song on that chart, beating out "Madness" by Muse, which spent 19 weeks at the top from 2012 to 2013.

In Billboards November 11, 2017 issue, "Feel It Still" joined the list of songs since 2003 to have reached number one on six of the major airplay charts: Radio Songs, Pop Songs, Adult Pop Songs, Alternative Songs, Adult Alternative Songs and Dance/Mix Show Airplay. Portugal. The Man is the first act to accomplish this feat since Gotye and Kimbra with "Somebody That I Used to Know" in 2012; they are the only artists to have a number-one Alternative and Adult Alternative single also reach number one on the Dance/Mix Show Airplay since the chart's launch in August 2003. They are now also one of twelve acts to have achieved the feat of having reached number one on six or more airplay charts.The YouTube video has more than 326,000,000 views.

Charts

Weekly charts

Year-end charts

Decade-end charts

Certifications

Release history

See also
 List of Billboard number-one alternative singles of the 2010s
 List of Billboard number-one adult alternative singles of the 2010s

References

2017 songs
2017 singles
Portugal. The Man songs
Grammy Award for Best Pop Duo/Group Performance
Songs written by John Hill (record producer)
Songs written by Robert Bateman (songwriter)
Songs written by Freddie Gorman
Songs written by Brian Holland
Number-one singles in Iceland
Number-one singles in Russia
Funk songs
Psychedelic pop songs